is a Japanese photographer, painter, and multimedia artist. Her chosen medium is the photogram.

Early life and education 
Born in Nagoya, Japan, she moved to the United States in 1963 to study at the School of the Art Institute of Chicago where she received her B.F.A. in 1967.

Career 
Her first group exhibition was Vision and Expression, at the George Eastman House, in Rochester, New York in 1969 and her first one-person exhibition was at the Warren Benedek Gallery in New York City in 1972. Her works "Sex & Nature" were included in the Annual Exhibition of Painting at the Whitney Museum of American Art in 1972.

In 1980 she adopted the classic black and white photogram technique as a means for her artistic expression.

She has had numerous major solo exhibitions which include, Sugiura Kunié: Aspiring Experiments: New York in 50 Years, Tokyo Photographic Art Museum (2018), Time Emit, Visual Arts Center of New Jersey, Summit, New Jersey (2008) and Dark Matters / Light Affairs, The University of California, Davis (2001).

Her works are included in the permanent collections of the Denver Art Museum; The Museum of Fine Arts, Boston; The Museum of Modern Art, New York; and the Tokyo Metropolitan Museum of Photography.

Awards 
She has received the Higashikawa Prize (2007) and the Artist’s Fellowship, New York Foundation for the Arts (1998).

Personal life 
She lives and works in New York City.

Selected works

Books 
 Sugiura, Kunié, Dark matters, light affairs, New York, NY : Arts Management, 2000. .
 Sugiura, Kunié, Artists and Scientists, Nazraeli Press, 2007. .

References
Nihon shashinka jiten / 328 Outstanding Japanese Photographers. Kyoto: Tankōsha, 2000. .

Further reading 
 Carol Armstrong, “Cameraless: From Natural Illustrations and Nature Prints to Manual and Photogenic Drawings and Other Botanographs,” in Ocean Flowers: Impressions from Nature (Princeton, NJ: Princeton University Press, 2004), 104.
Arning, Bill; Smith, Joel, Kunié Sugiura, Frances Lehman Loeb Art Center, Vassar College, 2000. Essays on Sugiura's work.
 Glueck, Grace, "Art in Review; Kunié Sugiura -- 'The Artist Papers and Other Works'", The New York Times, January 18, 2002

Japanese photographers
1942 births
Living people
People from Nagoya
Japanese expatriates in the United States
Japanese women photographers
20th-century photographers
21st-century photographers
School of the Art Institute of Chicago alumni
20th-century women photographers
21st-century women photographers